Giorgi Arabidze (born 4 March 1998) is a Georgian professional footballer who plays as a winger for Torpedo Kutaisi.

Career

Club career
Arabidze is a product of the FC Locomotive Youth Sportive system from age 7.

In June 2015 he signed a contract with Ukrainian football club FC Shakhtar. Arabidze made an official debut for the Ukrainian club three months later against Ternopil in the Ukrainian Cup, spending the full 90 minutes on the pitch.

Arabidze has again featured for Shakhtar on the last day of October, making his debut in the Ukrainian Premier League, playing the last 15 minutes of the game against Zorya Luhansk.

Arabidze has been included in the UEFA Youth League squad for the same season as well. He made a debut in this tournament against Malmö FF, scoring a single goal and contributing one assist in a 5–5 draw.

On 3 July 2018 he signed 4-year contract with Portuguese club C.D. Nacional.

On 17 January 2021, he joined Russian club Rotor Volgograd on loan until the end of the 2020–21 season.

On 25 January 2022, he signed with Torpedo Kutaisi.

International career
In 2017, after being a regular member of the youth sides of Georgia national football team, Arabidze made his debut for the senior national team against Serbia in 2018 FIFA World Cup qualification match. Two days later he scored his first goal for the team against Latvia in a friendly game.

Career statistics

International goals
Scores and results list Georgia's goal tally first.

Honours

Shakhtar Donetsk
Ukrainian Premier League: (2) 2016–17, 2017–18
Ukrainian Cup: (3) 2015–16, 2016–17, 2017–18
Ukrainian Super Cup: (2) 2015, 2017

Torpedo Kutaisi
Georgian Cup: 2022

References

External links
UEFA Profile

1998 births
Living people
Footballers from Georgia (country)
Association football wingers
FC Lokomotivi Tbilisi players
FC Shakhtar Donetsk players
Georgia (country) international footballers
C.D. Nacional players
Adanaspor footballers
FC Rotor Volgograd players
FC Samtredia players
FC Torpedo Kutaisi players
Erovnuli Liga players
Ukrainian Premier League players
Primeira Liga players
TFF First League players
Russian Premier League players
Expatriate footballers from Georgia (country)
Expatriate footballers in Ukraine
Expatriate sportspeople from Georgia (country) in Ukraine
Expatriate footballers in Portugal
Expatriate sportspeople from Georgia (country) in Portugal
Expatriate footballers in Turkey
Expatriate sportspeople from Georgia (country) in Turkey
Expatriate footballers in Russia
Expatriate sportspeople from Georgia (country) in Russia